The Russian First Division was the 19th season of Russia's second-tier football league since the dissolution of the Soviet Union. The season began on 27 March 2010.

Teams
As in the previous year, 20 clubs participate in this year championship. It features eleven clubs from Russian First Division 2009, two clubs relegated from Russian Premier League 2009, five zone winners from Russian Second Division 2009, one of the second-placed clubs from Russian Second Division 2009 and one of the third-placed clubs from Russian Second Division 2009.

Movement between Premier League and First Division
Anzhi Makhachkala as 2009 champions and Sibir Novosibirsk as runners-up have been promoted to the Premier League. They will be replaced by relegated teams Kuban Krasnodar and Khimki.

Movement between First Division and Second Division
Nosta Novotroitsk, Chita, Chernomorets Novorossiysk, Metallurg Lipetsk and MVD Rossii Moscow who placed in the last 5 places respectively in 2009 were relegated to the Russian Second Division.

The relegated teams were replaced by the five 2009 Second Division zone winners. These were Dynamo Saint Petersburg (West), Avangard Kursk (Centre), Zhemchuzhina-Sochi (South), Mordovia Saransk (Ural-Povolzhye) and Irtysh Omsk (East).

Further team changes
Due to financial difficulties, Vityaz Podolsk who placed 11th in 2009, decided to give up their spot in the Russian First Division and participate in the Russian Second Division in 2010.

Pending licensing, their place was taken by FC Volgograd who placed 3rd in the Russian Second Division (South Zone) in 2009. For the occasion the management decided to change the name of the club from FC Volgograd to Rotor Volgograd.

FC Alania Vladikavkaz were promoted into the 2010 Russian Premier League after FC Moscow dropped out due to financial reasons. It was replaced by FC Dynamo Bryansk. Dynamo Bryansk originally refused to be promoted when offered Vityaz's spot, but by the time Alania's spot became available, they found new financial commitments and agreed to participate in the First Division.

Overview

Managerial changes

Standings

Results

Top scorers
Last updated: 6 November 2010; Source: PFL 
21 goal
  Otar Martsvaladze (Volga)

18 goal
  Spartak Gogniyev (KAMAZ / Krasnodar )

16 goal
  Sergei Davydov (Volgar-Gazprom / Kuban)

15 goal
  Dmitri Golubov (Baltika)

13 goal
  Ruslan Mukhametshin (Mordovia)
  Sergei Serdyukov (KAMAZ)
  Aleksandr Tikhonovetsky (Nizhny Novgorod)

12 goal
  Azamat Gonezhukov (Dynamo St. Petersburg)

11 goal
  Maksim Demenko (Krasnodar / Zhemchuzhina-Sochi)
  Yevgeni Kaleshin (Krasnodar)
  Kirill Panchenko (Mordovia)

10 goal
  Vasiliy Karmazinenko (SKA-Energiya)

Awards
Professional Football League announced the award winners for the season.

 Best player: Andrey Tikhonov (FC Khimki).
 Best goalkeeper: Aleksandr Budakov (FC Kuban Krasnodar).
 Best defender:  Milan Vještica (FC Shinnik Yaroslavl).
 Best midfielder: Andrey Tikhonov (FC Khimki).
 Best striker: Spartak Gogniyev (FC Krasnodar).
 Best manager: Robert Yevdokimov (FC KAMAZ Naberezhnye Chelny).

See also
Russian Premier League 2010

References

External links
2010 Russian First Division at Soccerway.com

2
Russian First League seasons
Russia
Russia